Dark Undercoat is the debut album by Emily Jane White released in 2007 on label Double Negative Records in the U.S. and by Talitres records in France.

Promotion
Cam Archer directed the music videos for "Wild Tigers I Have Known" (2006), "Dagger" (2007), and "Dark Undercoat" (2007).  The video for "Wild Tigers I Have Known" is included as an extra on the DVD release of Archer's film Wild Tigers I Have Known, which takes its name from White's song.

Track listing

Personnel
Cam Archer - photography
Wainwright Hewlett - engineer, mastering, mixing
Emily Jane White - guitar, piano, vocals

Charts

References

2007 albums
Emily Jane White albums